The lined wrasse, Anampses lineatus, is a species of wrasse native to the Indo-Pacific from the Red Sea to South Africa east to Bali. It can be found in the aquarium trade.

Common Name 
Lined wrasse

Habitat 
Salt water

Dispersion 
Thai Sea Boundary

Utilization 
-

References

External links
marinespecies.org
Encyclopedia of Life

Fish of Thailand
Lined wrasse
Taxa named by John Ernest Randall 
Fish described in 1972